Mlékosrby is a municipality and village in Hradec Králové District in the Hradec Králové Region of the Czech Republic. It has about 200 inhabitants.

Notable people
František Kloz (1905–1945), footballer

References

Villages in Hradec Králové District